Empress Xiaojingcheng (19 June 1812 – 21 August 1855), of the Manchu Plain Yellow Banner Borjigit clan, was a posthumous name bestowed to a consort of Mianning, the Daoguang Emperor. She was honoured as Empress Dowager Kangci during the reign of her step-son, Yizhu, the Xianfeng Emperor. She was the only Qing empress dowager who was neither her husband's empress consort nor emperor's mother.

Life

Family background
Empress Xiaojingcheng's personal name was not recorded in history. She was a Khorchin Mongol of the Plain Blue Banner by birth.

 Father: Hualiang'a, served as a fifth rank literary official in the Ministry of Justice, and held the title of a first class duke
 Paternal grandfather: Kunshan
 Mother: Lady Aisin Gioro
 Maternal grandfather: Yongxi (d. 1821), held the title Prince Su of the First Rank from 1778 to 1821, Hooge's great-great-grandson
 Maternal grandmother: Lady Namdulu (那木都鲁氏), Yongxi's primary consort
 One brother
 One sister

Jiaqing era
The future Empress Xiaojingcheng was born on the 11th day of the fifth lunar month in the 17th year of the reign of the Jiaqing Emperor, which translates to 19 June 1812 in the Gregorian calendar.

Daoguang era
In 1825, Lady Borjigit entered the Forbidden City and was granted the title "Noble Lady Jing" by the Daoguang Emperor. On 22 November 1826, she gave birth to the emperor's second son, Yigang, who would die prematurely on 5 March 1827.

Noble Lady Jing was elevated on 29 December 1826 to "Concubine Jing", and on 15 May 1827 to "Consort Jing". She gave birth on 2 December 1829 to the emperor's third son, Yiji, who would die prematurely on 22 January 1830, on 20 January 1831 to his sixth daughter, Princess Shou'en of the First Rank, and on 11 January 1833 to his sixth son, Yixin. On 17 September 1834, she was elevated to "Noble Consort Jing".

The Daoguang Emperor's second empress consort, Empress Xiaoquancheng, died on 13 February 1840, and Noble Consort Jing was placed in charge of the emperor's harem. On 9 January 1841, she was elevated to "Imperial Noble Consort".

Xianfeng era
When the Daoguang Emperor died on 26 February 1850, his fourth son, Yizhu, who was enthroned as the Xianfeng Emperor, refused to make Lady Borjigit the empress dowager. Instead, the Xianfeng Emperor honoured her with the title "Imperial Noble Consort Dowager Kangci". She and her only surviving son, Yixin, were not satisfied with this arrangement. According to imperial customs, Imperial Noble Consort Dowager Kangci had no right to claim the position of empress dowager because she was neither the birth mother of the Xianfeng Emperor, nor did she hold the rank of Empress while the Daoguang Emperor was still living. Although the Xianfeng Emperor ignored her appeals to become empress dowager, he treated her respectfully like a stepmother.

In 1852, Imperial Noble Consort Dowager Kangci, as the highest ranked living consort of the previous emperor, was allowed to exercise her privilege to select potential candidates to be the Xianfeng Emperor's consorts. Among those she chose were the future Empress Dowager Ci'an and Empress Dowager Cixi.

Imperial Noble Consort Dowager Kangci became critically ill in August 1855. Fearing that she had little time left, she conspired with her son, Yixin, to earn her the title of empress dowager before she died. Yixin then issued an imperial edict to honor his mother without full consent of the Xianfeng Emperor. In order to save himself from public embarrassment, the Emperor, although being displeased, reluctantly acknowledged the title later.

She became Empress Dowager Kangci on 13 August 1855 and died eight days later. The Xianfeng Emperor appointed two princes, one of whom was Yixin, to take charge of the funeral arrangements, and announced that he would spend the mourning period in the Hall of Mental Cultivation.

In 1857, Empress Dowager Kangci was interred in the Mu Mausoleum of the Western Qing tombs. She was also granted the posthumous title "Empress Xiaojing". The Xianfeng Emperor did not add the character cheng – indicating her status as an empress consort of the Daoguang Emperor, as were Empresses Xiaomucheng, Xiaoshencheng and Xiaoquancheng – to her posthumous title because he wanted to highlight his belief that Empress Dowager Kangci never qualified as an empress consort. He also did not give her a place in the Imperial Ancestral Temple, which meant that she would not be included in ancestral worship rites.

Tongzhi era
When the Xianfeng Emperor died on 22 August 1861, his first son and successor, the Tongzhi Emperor, was still too young to rule. In the Xinyou Coup that followed, the Empresses Dowager Ci'an and Cixi collaborated with Yixin to overthrow and seize power from a group of eight regents appointed by the Xianfeng Emperor on his deathbed. The two empresses dowager thus became the regents for the Tongzhi Emperor, with Yixin assisting as Prince-Regent. On 6 May 1862, in order to secure Yixin's allegiance towards the Tongzhi Emperor, the two empresses dowager issued an imperial decree that added the character cheng to Empress Dowager Kangci's posthumous title. Empress Dowager Kangci was also given a place in the Imperial Ancestral Temple and included in ancestral worship rites.

Titles
 During the reign of the Jiaqing Emperor (r. 1796–1820):
 Lady Borjigit (from 19 June 1812)
 During the reign of the Daoguang Emperor (r. 1820–1850):
 Noble Lady Jing (from 1825), sixth rank consort
 Imperial Concubine Jing (from 29 December 1826), fifth rank consort
 Consort Jing (from 15 May 1827), fourth rank consort
 Noble Consort Jing (from 17 September 1834), third rank consort
 Imperial Noble Consort (from 9 January 1841), second rank consort
 During the reign of the Xianfeng Emperor (r. 1850–1861):
 Imperial Noble Consort Kangci (from April 1851)
 Empress Dowager Kangci (from 13 August 1855)
 Empress Xiao Jing (from 20 September 1855)
 During the reign of the Tongzhi Emperor (r. 1861–1875):
 Empress Xiao Jing Cheng (from 6 May 1862)

Issue
 As Noble Lady Jing:
 Yigang (22 November 1826 – 5 March 1827), the Daoguang Emperor's second son
 As Consort Jing:
 Miscarriage at four months (28 June 1828)
 Yiji (2 December 1829 – 22 January 1830), the Daoguang Emperor's third son
 Princess Shou'en of the First Rank (20 January 1831 – 15 May 1859), the Daoguang Emperor's sixth daughter
 Married Jingshou (1829–1889) of the Manchu Fuca clan in May/June 1845
 Yixin (11 January 1833 – 29 May 1898), the Daoguang Emperor's sixth son, granted the title Prince Gong of the First Rank in 1850, posthumously honoured as Prince Gongzhong of the First Rank

Gallery

In fiction and popular culture
 Portrayed by Wan Suet-kei in The Rise and Fall of Qing Dynasty (1988)
 Portrayed by Fung So-bor in The Rise and Fall of Qing Dynasty (1990)
 Portrayed by Nancy Wu in Curse of the Royal Harem (2011)

See also
 Ranks of imperial consorts in China#Qing
 Royal and noble ranks of the Qing dynasty

Notes

References
 
 
 
 
 
 
 

1812 births
1855 deaths
Qing dynasty empresses
Consorts of the Daoguang Emperor
Qing dynasty empresses dowager
Xiaojingcheng
19th-century Chinese women
19th-century Chinese people
19th-century Mongolian women